The 2009–10 Villanova Wildcats women's basketball team will represent Villanova University in the 2009–10 NCAA Division I women's basketball season. The Wildcats are a member of the Big East and will attempt to win the NCAA championship. Courtney Davis is the Director of Basketball Operations

Offseason
July 17: On July 8, 2009, the Women's Basketball Coaches Association (WBCA) announced its winners for the 2008-09 Academic Top 25 Team Honor Roll. Villanova finished 18th in the nation on the Honor Roll with a 3.346 team grade point average. The Wildcats have earned a spot for the fourth consecutive year on the Honor Roll.

Regular season

Roster

Player stats

Postseason

NCAA basketball tournament

Awards and honors

Team players drafted into the WNBA

References

External links
Official site

Villanova Wildcats women's basketball seasons
Villanova
Villa
Villa